Ajayan Venugopalan is an Indian screenwriter, film director.

Life
He started his career as a writer/director of the acclaimed Malayalam television sitcom Akkara Kazhchakal. This T.V series was followed by a movie based on the show called Akkarakazhchakal: The Movie which he wrote and co-directed with Abi Varghese. His first break into Malayalam films happened as a scriptwriter with the movie English: An Autumn in London directed by Shyamaprasad. Metro Park  the show he wrote and directed has been critically and commercially a big success. The show has been nominated for multiple awards and is slated for season 2. Ajayan currently completed writing and directing a Hindi feature film titled Shiv Shastri Balboa starring Anupam Kher, Neena Gupta, Jugal Hansraj, Nargis Fakri, Sharib Hashmi.

Filmography

References

External links
 
 Thehindu.com
 Archives.deccanchronicle.com
 Timesofindia.indiatimes.com
 Thehindu.com
 Article.wn.com
 https://indianexpress.com/article/entertainment/web-series/sarita-joshi-on-metro-park-2-it-was-a-challenge-to-shoot-from-home-without-a-co-star-7164999/
https://www.indiawest.com/entertainment/global/season-2-of-eros-now-family-comedy-metro-park-to-premiere-on-jan-29-milind/article_aab58790-6026-11eb-887e-cb2bfa2bd996.html
https://www.indiatoday.in/binge-watch/story/metro-park-season-2-trailer-out-whacky-patel-family-is-back-with-crazy-antics-1761772-2021-01-22

Year of birth missing (living people)
Living people
20th-century Indian film directors
Malayalam film directors
Malayalam screenwriters
Artists from Palakkad
Film directors from Kerala
Screenwriters from Kerala
Television personalities from Kerala
Indian television directors